The Illinois Railway Museum (IRM, reporting mark IRMX) is the largest railroad museum in the United States.

Overview

History 
The museum was founded in 1953 by ten people who joined to purchase Indiana Railroad interurban car 65. Originally called the Illinois Electric Railway Museum, the museum was located on the grounds of the Chicago Hardware Foundry in North Chicago. In 1961, it was renamed to the Illinois Railway Museum to reflect its expanding scope. In 1964, the museum moved to Union, Illinois along the former right-of-way of the Elgin and Belvidere Electric Company. In 1968 the first steam locomotive was operated at the museum. The first storage barn was erected in 1972. In 1981, a  streetcar loop was constructed. The right-of-way the museum was constructed next to still had back taxes into the 1980s. To gain full use of the track, the museum paid the back taxes, and gained the 4.6 miles (7.4 km) of railroad track to add to their property portfolio. In 2016, the IRM purchased a 130-foot turntable from Union Pacific's former Denver & Rio Grande Western Burnham Shops complex in Denver for $10,000. The turntable is large enough for any locomotive in their collection, and will be used to store their steam locomotives, along with a planned roundhouse. Currently, there are around 450 pieces of equipment, and over 100 acres of land owned by the museum.

Operations 
The museum's operations are primarily concentrated around its main campus just east of Union. Train rides are offered on the main line as well as the streetcar loop. Electric trains are operated from April through October and diesel and steam trains from the beginning of May through the end of September. Trolleybus operation occurs on the Saturdays of the Memorial Day, Independence Day, and Labor Day weekends, as well as on "Bus Day"; the last Saturday in September or the first Saturday in October. IRM is one of only two railway museums in the country that operates both electric and diesel trains, and the only one to offer trolleybus rides on a regular basis.

Equipment and structures

Museum site and structures 
In 2009, the museum bought another  of adjacent land as a buffer against development. In addition to the museum's revenue trackage, the main campus in Union includes: 
 Two additional garages housing trolleybuses and motor buses
 A dedicated steam restoration shop
 A former Chicago and North Western railway depot from Marengo, Illinois, built in 1851
 A complete Chicago Rapid Transit Company ground-level station (50th Avenue station, closed by CTA in 1978)
 Five streetcar stations of varying design
 Several restored and functional neon signs and concrete entablatures on display
 An indoor dining facility built in 2003 (open seasonally)
 The Multi-purpose Building completed in 2021 housing the Model Railroad Display, the Revolving Exhibit Gallery and the Milwaukee Road Historic Association. 
 A  turntable from the Union Pacific Railroad's Burnham Shops
7 railroad crossings, with 5 wigwags. Two of the 5 wigwags are upper-quadrant wigwags from the Magnetic Signal Company, one from the Union Switch & Signal, and the other two are lower quadrant wigwag from the Western Railroad Supply Company. The other two crossings are from the Griswold Signal Company.
IRM also owns two off-site libraries; the Pullman Library in downtown Union and the Strahorn Research Library in downtown Marengo.

Equipment

Locomotives

Other equipment 
 Toronto Transit Commission CLRV #4034, the newest in the museum's streetcar collection. The streetcar is being regauged (truck exchange or Wheelset exchange) from TTC gauge to operate on IRM's  trackage.
 Nebraska Zephyr: Streamlined Chicago, Burlington and Quincy Railroad passenger train
 North Shore Line Electroliner trainset: One of only two built, under restoration
 Two New York City Transit Authority IRT Division R28 Series subway cars from 1960 (numbers 7926–7927): Built by ACF in the Berwick, Pennsylvania Plant
 The museum's depot: Built in 1851 for the Galena and Chicago Union Railroad, the oldest train station west of the Appalachian Mountains in regular use
 23 electric trolleybuses from Chicago, Dayton, Ohio, Cleveland, Des Moines, Iowa, Vancouver, Edmonton, Toronto, Milwaukee, San Francisco, Indianapolis, and Seattle;
 13 motor buses: from CTA (3), Janesville, WI (2), RTA (1), CMC (1), CSL (1), NSL (1), StL Public Service (1), Connecticut Co (1), Bee Line (1), and Montebello (1).

Formerly owned locomotives

Organization 
The Illinois Railway Museum is an IRS Chapter 501(c)3 nonprofit corporation owned and managed by its membership. Museum management includes a board of directors, elected by the regular membership of about 160 active volunteers. A board president is elected by the directors. The board oversees the general manager, a volunteer who in turn has oversight over an array of department heads. Major departments include Steam, Diesel, Electric Car, Passenger Car, Freight Car, Track & Signal, Buildings & Grounds, Trolley Bus, Motor Bus, and Operations. Other departments oversee the museum's libraries, electrical infrastructure, and display and education functions. Most department heads are volunteers. All workers at the museum fall under the direct authority of one of the department heads. The vast majority of workers are volunteers. Anyone who is interested in trains or other collections/aspects of the museum is actively encouraged to volunteer, with required training done by the museum.

Use in film 
IRM has been used in several films, due to its proximity to Chicago and its extensive collection of historic railroad equipment. In the 1992 film A League of Their Own, starring Tom Hanks, Geena Davis, and Madonna, the museum's depot was used for several small-town depot scenes; other scenes featured with the Nebraska Zephyr and only surviving EMD E5. The 1993 movie Groundhog Day featured the museum's EMD SD24 diesel locomotive. The museum's grounds and some of the passenger cars were used in the movie The Babe, starring John Goodman. In late 2005, the Burlington 9911A and several coaches operated to Chicago for filming in Flags of Our Fathers, a Clint Eastwood film. Transformers: Age of Extinction starring Mark Wahlberg, released in 2014, made IRM the host of several scenes.

Many television shows' railroad sequences have been shot at the IRM. Scenes depicting steam era operations in the late 1920s were shot for the 1993 television series The Untouchables. The hit show Chicago Fire features the IRM onsite in the season 2 episode "No Regrets".

Special events 
 Day Out with Thomas

See also 

 List of common carrier freight railroads in the United States
 List of Illinois railroads
 List of heritage railroads in the United States
 List of railway museums

References

External links

 

1953 establishments in Illinois
Heritage railroads in Illinois
Illinois railroads
Museums established in 1953
Museums in McHenry County, Illinois
Railroad museums in Illinois
Street railway museums in the United States
Trolleybus transport in the United States